Rabian Engelbrecht (born 4 November 1992) is a South African cricketer who currently plays for Boland. He is a right-handed batsman and right-arm fast-medium bowler. Engelbrecht made his first-class debut on 30 September 2010 against Eastern Province. He was included in the KwaZulu-Natal cricket team squad for the 2015 Africa T20 Cup. In August 2017, he was named in Jo'burg Giants' squad for the first season of the T20 Global League. However, in October 2017, Cricket South Africa initially postponed the tournament until November 2018, with it being cancelled soon after.

References

External links
Rabian Engelbrecht profile  at CricketArchive

1992 births
Living people
Cricketers from Paarl
Afrikaner people
South African people of Dutch descent
South African cricketers
Boland cricketers